Busso Thoma (31 October 1899 – 23 January 1945) was a salesman.

Thoma was born in Sankt Blasien-Immeneich, Black Forest. In 1939, he became a consultant on the staff of the General Army Office (AHA), where, as a Major, he later became an accessory to the 20 July Plot to assassinate German dictator Adolf Hitler.

On 14 September 1944, Thoma was arrested, on 17 January 1945, he was sentenced to death by the "People's Court" (Volksgerichtshof), and on 23 January 1945, he was hanged at Plötzensee Prison in Berlin.

Sources
 Plötzensee Prison

See also
 List of members of the 20 July plot

1899 births
1945 deaths
People from Sankt Blasien
People from the Grand Duchy of Baden
German Army officers of World War II
People condemned by Nazi courts
Executed members of the 20 July plot
People from Baden-Württemberg executed at Plötzensee Prison
Executed people from Baden-Württemberg
People executed by hanging at Plötzensee Prison
Military personnel from Baden-Württemberg